Affiliated is the eleventh studio album by American rapper MC Eiht, released April 4, 2006 on Paid in Full Entertainment.

Track listing
CPT MF'z
Which Way Iz Up
Say Nuthin'   (featuring Tha Chill)
What The Fuc U Want Me 2 Do  (featuring Tha Chill & Bam)
The Ghetto
G'sta Melody
Just Lean
CPT'z Bac
Where U Frum (featuring G-Luv of Tha Road Dawgs)
Gangsta Minded (featuring Tha Chill & Jaz)
Respect It  (featuring Compton's Most Wanted)
N My Neighborhood
Pipe Down  (featuring Tha Chill & Boki)
Smoke Dis*   (featuring Tha Chill & Jayo Felony)

References

External links
MC Eiht Interview

MC Eiht albums
2006 albums